Yang Caiyu (born 28 September 1992) is a Chinese actress and singer. She made her acting debut in the short film Boy's Dairy (2012), and has since gone on to appear in numerous film titles such as  Love in the 1980s (2015), Youth (2017) and Don't Forget Your Original Heart (2018).

Early life and education
Born in 1992 to parents of Thai Chinese descent, Yang attended a kindergarten in Wuhan before moving to Shenzhen, where she finished fifth grade and skipped directly to junior high school. In the second year of junior high school, she was one of the city's top three students and the only one in her whole grade. In March 2007, she served as the host of the 2nd National Primary and Secondary School Art Exhibition and Awards Gala finals hosted by the Ministry of Education.

After graduating from junior high school, she moved to the United States where she continued with her high school education. In 2011, Yang was accepted to the University of Southern California, Boston University and other five universities in the United States for major in media, but chose to return to China where she applied for admission as a foreign candidate at the Beijing Film Academy. She was successfully admitted to the Performance Department and actress Zhou Dongyu was in her same class. During her time at the Beijing Film Academy, she served as a freshman class representative of the Performance Department and bilingual host of the 10th Beijing Film Academy International Student Film Festival in 2011.

After she graduated from Beijing Film Academy in 2017, Yang received an offer of admission from Columbia University for MFA, making her the third Chinese candidate to receive admission at the MFA program in Columbia University. But she declined the admission in order to pursue her acting career.

Career
In 2003, she sang the ending song of the Chinese animated series The Legend of Nezha. In April 2012, she made her acting debut in the short film Boy's Diary, a promotional short film for Peking University. In 2014, Yang starred alongside Scott Adkins and Dolph Lundgren in the 3-D movie Legendary: Tomb of the Dragon. In 2012, she starred in the TV drama Code of Youth.

In 2015, she starred in the romance film Love in the 1980s, which was directed Huo Jianqi. In the film, she played the role of Cheng Liwen. The film was nominated in the 18th Shanghai International Film Festival. In 2017, she starred in the mystery thriller film Edge of Innocence and on the same year, she starred in the film Youth, which was directed by Feng Xiaogang and written by Yan Geling. In the film, she played the role of Lin Dingding and for her performance, she received the Best Supporting Actress Award at the first Marianas International Film Festival in Saipan.

In 2018, she starred alongside Li Chen and Wang Qianyuan in the adventure suspense TV drama Seven Days. In 2020, she starred in the film Only Cloud Knows, which was also directed by Feng Xiaogang.

In 2021, she starred in a series of short dramas Faith Makes Great, which was made by the National Radio and Television Administration to celebrate the 100th anniversary of the founding of the Communist Party of China. On the same year, for her performance in the TV drama Like a Flowing River 2, she was nominated for Best Actress in a Chinese Contemporary TV Drama at the 32nd Huading Awards.

Personal life
On 6 July 2017, Yang publicly revealed that she was in a relationship with businessman Chen Jinfei, the CEO of Beijing Tongchan Investment Group and Hongxing Entertainment Media Investment Co., Ltd, and is 30 years older than her. Chen was also the member of the 9th and 10th National Committee of the Chinese People's Political Consultative Conference. He is also the godfather of Chinese actress Liu Yifei.

On 18 December 2019, some Chinese news outlets broke the news that Yang and Chen were married. When enquired Yang for confirmation
of the news, she did not respond, while Chen did not deny the news and at the same time stated that "there is no need to respond to this, it is just a matter of her own life".

Filmography

Films
Legendary: Tomb of the Dragon (2014) - Bai Xi
Love in the 1980s (2015) - Cheng Liwen 
Edge of Innocence (2017) - Xia Yingying
Youth (2017) - Lin Dingding
Only Cloud Knows (2019) - Jennifer Luo Yun
Inversion (TBA)
The White Storm 3 (TBA) - Noon

Television
Happy Camp (1997) - Herself (Episode No. 1008)
Day Day Up (2008) - Herself (Episode No. 681)
Code of Youth (2012) - Ouyang Keyi
Twenty-Four Hours (2018) - Herself (Season 3, Episode No. 6 & 7)
Seven Days (2019) - Jenny
Truth! Flowers and Everything (2019) - Herself 
Sniper (2020) - Ouyang Xiangling
Like a Flowing River 2 (2020) - Liang Sishen
Faith Makes Great (2021) - Ge Lan
Ode to Joy 3 (2022) - Fang Zhiheng
Like a Flowing River 3 (2023) - Liang Sishen
Ode to Joy 4 - Fang Zhiheng (TBA)
Ode to Joy 5 - Fang Zhiheng (TBA)

References

External links
 
  

1992 births
Living people
Actresses from Wuhan
Chinese film actresses
Chinese television actresses
21st-century Chinese women singers
21st-century Chinese actresses
Beijing Film Academy alumni
Chinese people of Thai descent
Chinese expatriates in the United States